The Pentax Q series is a series of mirrorless interchangeable-lens cameras made by Pentax and introduced in 2011 with the initial model Pentax Q. , it was the world's smallest, lightest interchangeable lens digital camera. The first models used a 1/2.3" (6.17 x 4.55 mm) back-illuminated sensor CMOS image sensor. The Q7, introduced in June 2013, uses a larger 1/1.7" type sensor (7.44 x 5.58 mm). The Q system is now discontinued.

Characteristics
The Pentax Q and Q10 sensors have a crop factor of 5.53× while the Pentax Q7 and Q-s1 have a crop factor of 4.65×. The original Pentax Q sensor has a 12.4 megapixels with 1.52 µm pixel pitch. All Pentax Q system cameras have a short flange focal distance (FFD) of 9.2mm. With a 5.53× crop factor, an adapted 100mm lens has the equivalent field of view (FOV) of a 553mm telephoto in the 35mm full-frame format. An additional implication of these relatively large crop factors is that depth of field (DOF) is proportionally increased relative to full-frame systems at the same equivalent focal length and aperture; this puts the Pentax Q system cameras at a distinct advantage when capturing as much as possible with acceptable focus is important.

Pentax Q system cameras do not have a mechanical shutter or neutral density filter in the camera body. Because of this, some lenses and adapters have a built-in mechanical leaf shutter and/or a built-in ND filter.

The short flange focal distance of the Pentax Q series enables lenses from many manufacturers to be adapted to it, including Olympus OM, Canon FD, Minolta, M42 screw mount, M39 Leica, C-Mount, D-Mount, Pentax K, and Pentax 6×7. A Pentax adapter with a synchronized shutter for Pentax K-mount lenses was released in October 2012.

The camera is equipped with "SR" sensor-shift image stabilization technology to improve image quality when using the camera without a tripod. It works with all native and adapted lenses. The Pentax Q also features a "blur control" mode to provide a pseudo shallow focus effect when desired.

Models

Pentax Q 

The initial model was announced in June, 2011.

Pentax Q10 

Announced in September, 2012, the Q10 has a slightly redesigned body and an improved sensor. Most features and specifications were unchanged.

Pentax Q7 

The Q7 was announced in June 2013 and has a larger 1/1.7" sensor. It is available in a wide variety of colors.

Pentax Q-S1 

The Q-S1 was announced August 4, 2014. It has a 1/1.7" sensor. In addition to the Q-7 features, it has auto focusing in the video mode (with the 01, 02 and 08 lenses.)

Lenses
Eight lenses have been released in the Pentax Q system. (AF = Auto Focus, MF = Manual Focus):

Notes: *Any lenses adapted to the adapter will function in MF only. Whether it is single or varifocal depends on the optical characteristic of the lens.

**Although the adapter itself cannot have a focal length or filter diameter, the focal length/filter diameter for adapter/lens combination will depend on the lens attached.

***The maximum aperture depends on the lens aperture for most lenses. However, for larger-aperture lenses, since the adapter controls the aperture, the effective f-stop may increase or falloff may become more apparent.

****The minimum aperture depends on the adapter.

See also
 Pentax Auto 110
 List of Pentax products

References

External links
 
 Pentax Q review at Pentax Forums

Q